Manzanillo is a city and seat of Manzanillo Municipality, in the Mexican state of Colima. The city, located on the Pacific Ocean, contains Mexico's busiest port, responsible for handling Pacific cargo for the Mexico City area. It is the largest-producing municipality for the business sector and tourism in the small state of Colima.

The city has been referred to as the "sailfish capital of the world". Since 1957, it has hosted national and international fishing competitions, such as the Dorsey Tournament. Manzanillo has developed as a destination for international tourism.

History
16th century
In 1522, Gonzalo de Sandoval, under orders from conquistador Hernán Cortés, dropped anchor in the Bay of Salagua (north of Manzanillo Bay), looking for safe harbors and good shipbuilding sites. In the year before he left, Sandoval granted an audience to local Native chieftains in a small cove, which today carries the name Playa de La Audiencia. A great part of his fleet, which left to conquer the Philippines, was constructed in Salagua.

Manzanillo Bay was discovered in 1527 by navigator Alvaro de Saavedra, naming it Santiago de la Buena Esperanza, or "St. James of Good Hope". Manzanillo was the third port created by the Spanish in the Viceroyalty of New Spain. It became a departure point for important expeditions. Cortés visited the bay twice to protect his galleons from Portuguese pirates. Over the next 300 years, the Pacific Coast's history is filled with accounts of pirates from Portugal, England, France and even Spain assaulting, looting and burning ships for their rich cargos.

19th century
In 1825 the Port of Manzanillo opened, in recently independent Mexico, and so named because of the abundant groves of native Manzanilla (Hippomane mancinella) trees that were used extensively in the early days of shipbuilding. Manzanillo was raised to the status of a city on 15 June 1873. The railroad to Colima was completed in 1889.

20th century
In 1908, President Porfirio Diaz designated Manzanillo as an official port of entry to Mexico. It was the state capital of Colima from 20 February to 1 March 1915, while Pancho Villa's troops were threatening to capture the city of Colima.

Description
In the 2005 census, the city of Manzanillo had a population of 110,728 and in 2010 its municipality had 161,420. It is the second-largest community in the state, after Colima, the capital. Manzanillo is also a beach resort, and is one of many locations to promote themselves as the "sailfish capital" of the world. One way they promote that claim is by hosting a yearly sailfish fishing tournament. The Revillagigedo Islands, off the west coast of Mexico in the Pacific Ocean, are part of the municipality, but they are directly administered by the federal government.

Manzanillo is a sister city of the U.S. cities of Flagstaff, Arizona; San Pablo, California; and Saint Paul, Minnesota.

Tourism

The city is well known internationally for deep-sea fishing and the green flash phenomenon during sunsets, as well as the warm waters of the ocean.  The city is a destination resort and has many hotels and self-contained resorts, particularly built on the De Santiago peninsula which juts out into the Pacific north of the city centre. Also at the north end of Manzanillo bay is the resort Las Hadas ("the fairies"), which is the most famous of the city's resorts, having been featured in the movie 10 starring Bo Derek and Dudley Moore. Beach scenes were filmed on La Audencia Bay, just over the hill from Las Hadas.
Manzanillo is a popular cruise ship port of call. Many tourists go from their cruise ships on city tours. Excellent swimming, snorkeling, and scuba diving is found in Santiago Bay, a few miles north of the city where a cargo ship sank in a hurricane in 1959. Other wrecks and reefs plentiful with fish are scattered throughout the bay.
SS Golden Gate sank in 1862 in nearby Playa de Oro, which is named after the huge cargo of gold she was carrying.
Optimists still search for gold on the beach.

Manzanillo is known as the Sailfish Capital of the World. Since 1957, it has hosted important national and international fishing competitions, such as the Dorsey Tournament, making it a very attractive fishing destination.

Manzanillo consists of two bays with crescent-shaped beaches, each about 4 miles in length. Bahía de Manzanillo is closer to downtown and is the older tourist section. Bahía de Santiago, to the west, is the newer and more upscale area. The two are separated by the Santiago Peninsula. Ship channels are located at the southeast end of Bahía de Manzanillo where large cruise ships enter the port area. Manzanillo was once the scene of piracy and adventure. By 2011, its peaceful bays and sophisticated tourist and port infrastructure had made it one of the main tourist resorts and trading centers in the west of Mexico.

On 6 July 2010, the Secretariat of Communications and Transportation (Secretaría de Comunicaciones y Transportes) opened a specialized dock for cruise ships at the port, which involved an investment of $100 million pesos (MXN) in the first stage. A second phase foresees the construction of a shopping centre.

Climate
Manzanillo has a tropical savanna climate (Köppen climate classification Aw). The dry season, which is from November to May, has low amounts of precipitation, and temperatures tend to be cooler than in the wet season. The wet season, which runs from June to October, has warmer temperatures, averaging  in July, and humidity during this time is higher.

In 2012, the port of Manzanillo initiated an ecological project consisting of dredged canals and creating islands in the Lagoon of the Valle de las Garzas, a protected wildlife area. With this work, the port plans to increase the flow into the lagoon, thus increasing the viability of the enhanced ecosystem that includes the planting of 15,000 mangrove trees. Extensive use of geotextile tubes was included in the channel creation. These geotextile tubes were used to create two parallel breakwaters on either side of the dredged channels.

Hurricane Patricia
On Friday, 23 October 2015, Manzanillo was caught in the path of Hurricane Patricia. A Category 5 on the Saffir Simpson Hurricane wind scale, it was the most powerful cyclone ever measured in the Western Hemisphere, with sustained winds speed up to 200 mph (320 km/h). Hurricane Patricia made landfall on 23 October at 7:45pm with catastrophic damage. The center of the storm hit just north of Manzanillo, saving the town from the 200 mph winds. Puerto Vallarta was also near the catastrophic damage zone. Wind and high surf created a catastrophic damage zone. Damage totaled at least $283 million.

Transportation 

Manzanillo is the busiest port in Mexico, as measured by total tonnage and volume of containerized cargo.  In 2007, the port moved 1.4 million TEUs and 18.0 million tons of total cargo. Port business experienced a significant surge during the USA's West Coast Lockout in Long Beach, California, in 2002.  The port is connected by Ferromex rail lines to Guadalajara and Mexico City.

Manzanillo is also home to the Navy's Pacific Naval Force. Manzanillo also hosts the most efficient port for tuna landings in Mexico. It handles exports like fish, corn, copra, lemons, bananas, canned foods, wine, lumber, and minerals.

Manzanillo is well connected by Highway 200 to Colima City, to the Northwest and to Puerto Vallarta.

The Playa de Oro International Airport (ZLO) is a small airport located about 35 minutes north of Manzanillo along Highway 200. The airport offers international and national flights.  In addition to flights to and from the US, the airport has international service to and from Canada. The airport is operated by "Grupo Aeroportuario del Pacifico". Ground transportation is limited to taxis and car rentals. It has daily domestic and international flights and has recently been remodeled.

Sister cities 
,      Saint Paul, Minnesota, United States
,    Flagstaff, Arizona, United States
,     San Pablo, California, United States
 Santiago de Chile, Región Metropolitana de Santiago
 Ningbo, China
 Valparaíso, Chile Región de Valparaíso
 Weihai, China

See also

Challenger (1853 clipper)

References

External links

 
Sinking of the SS Golden Gate
Colima Enciclopedia de los Municipios de México (INAFED)
Sister Cities International - Online Directory: Mexico, Americas
Port of Manzanillo 

Populated places in Colima
Port cities and towns on the Mexican Pacific coast
Populated places established in 1527
1527 establishments in New Spain